Consumerism is a social and economic order that encourages the acquisition of goods and services in ever-increasing amounts. With the Industrial Revolution, but particularly in the 20th century, mass production led to overproduction—the supply of goods would grow beyond consumer demand, and so manufacturers turned to planned obsolescence and advertising to manipulate consumer spending. In 1899, a book on consumerism published by Thorstein Veblen, called The Theory of the Leisure Class, examined the widespread values and economic institutions emerging along with the widespread "leisure time" at the beginning of the 20th century. In it, Veblen "views the activities and spending habits of this leisure class in terms of conspicuous and vicarious consumption and waste. Both relate to the display of status and not to functionality or usefulness."

In economics, consumerism may refer to economic policies that emphasise consumption. In an abstract sense, it is the consideration that the free choice of consumers should strongly orient the choice by manufacturers of what is produced and how, and therefore orient the economic organization of a society (compare producerism, especially in the British sense of the term).

Consumerism has been widely criticized by both individuals who choose other ways of participating in the economy (i.e. choosing simple living or slow living) and experts evaluating the effects of modern capitalism on the world. Experts often assert that consumerism has physical limits, such as growth imperative and overconsumption, which have larger impacts on the environment, including direct effects like overexploitation of natural resources or large amounts of waste from disposable goods, and larger effects like climate change. Similarly, some research and criticism focuses on the sociological effects of consumerism, such as reinforcement of class barriers and creation of inequalities.

Term 
The term consumerism has several definitions. These definitions may not be related to each other and confusingly, they conflict with each other.

One sense of the term relates to efforts to support consumers' interests. By the early 1970s it had become the accepted term for the field and began to be used in these ways:
Consumerism is the concept that consumers should be informed decision makers in the marketplace. In this sense consumerism is the study and practice of matching consumers with trustworthy information, such as product testing reports.
Consumerism is the concept that the marketplace itself is responsible for ensuring social justice through fair economic practices. Consumer protection policies and laws compel manufacturers to make products safe.
Consumerism refers to the field of studying, regulating, or interacting with the marketplace. The consumer movement is the social movement which refers to all actions and all entities within the marketplace which give consideration to the consumer.
While the above definitions were becoming established, other people began using the term consumerism to mean "high levels of consumption". This definition has gained popularity since the 1970s and began to be used in these ways:
Consumerism is the selfish and frivolous collecting of products, or economic materialism. In this sense consumerism is negative and in opposition to positive lifestyles of anti-consumerism and simple living.
Consumerism is a force from the marketplace which destroys individuality and harms society. It is related to globalization and in protest against this some people promote the "anti-globalization movement".

In a 1955 speech, VP of Ford John Bugas coined the term consumerism as a substitute for capitalism to better describe the American economy:

Bugas's definition aligned with Austrian economics founder Carl Menger's vision (in his 1871 book Principles of Economics) of consumer sovereignty, whereby consumer preferences, valuations, and choices control the economy entirely (a concept directly opposed to the Marxian perception of the capitalist economy as a system of exploitation).

Vance Packard worked to change the meaning of the term consumerism from a positive word about consumer practices to a negative word meaning excessive materialism and waste.
The ads for his 1960 book The Waste Makers prominently featured the word consumerism in a negative way.

History

Origins

The consumer society emerged in the late 17th century and intensified throughout the 18th century.
While some claim that change was propelled by the growing middle-class who embraced new ideas about luxury consumption and about the growing importance of fashion as an arbiter for purchasing rather than necessity, many critics argue that consumerism was a political and economic necessity for the reproduction of capitalist competition for markets and profits, while others point to the increasing political strength of international working-class organizations during a rapid increase in technological productivity and decline in necessary scarcity as a catalyst to develop a consumer culture based on therapeutic entertainments, home-ownership and debt. The "middle-class" view argues that this revolution encompassed the growth in construction of vast country estates specifically designed to cater for comfort and the increased availability of luxury goods aimed at a growing market. Such luxury goods included sugar, tobacco, tea and coffee; these were increasingly grown on vast plantations (historically by slave labor) in the Caribbean as demand steadily rose. In particular, sugar consumption in Britain during the course of the 18th century increased by a factor of 20.

Critics argue that colonialism did indeed help drive consumerism, but they would place the emphasis on the supply rather than the demand as the motivating factor. An increasing mass of exotic imports as well as domestic manufactures had to be consumed by the same number of people who had been consuming far less than was becoming necessary. Historically, the notion that high levels of consumption of consumer goods is the same thing as achieving success or even freedom did not precede large-scale capitalist production and colonial imports. That idea was produced later, more or less strategically, to intensify consumption domestically and to make resistant cultures more flexible to extend its reach.

Culture of consumption

The pattern of intensified consumption became particularly visible in the 17th century in London, where the gentry and prosperous merchants took up residence and promoted a culture of luxury and consumption that slowly extended across socio-economic boundaries. Marketplaces expanded as shopping centres, such as the New Exchange, opened in 1609 by Robert Cecil in the Strand. Shops started to become important as places for Londoners to meet and socialise and became popular destinations alongside the theatre. From 1660, Restoration London also saw the growth of luxury buildings as advertisements for social position, with speculative architects like Nicholas Barbon and Lionel Cranfield operating. This then-scandalous line of thought caused great controversy with the publication of the influential work Fable of the Bees in 1714, in which Bernard Mandeville argued that a country's prosperity ultimately lay in the self-interest of the consumer.

The pottery entrepreneur and inventor, Josiah Wedgwood, noticed the way that aristocratic fashions, themselves subject to periodic changes in direction, slowly filtered down through different classes of society. He pioneered the use of marketing techniques to influence and manipulate the movement of prevailing tastes and preferences to cause the aristocracy to accept his goods; it was only a matter of time before the middle classes also rapidly bought up his goods. Other producers of a wide range of other products followed his example, and the spread and importance of consumption fashions became steadily more important. Since then, advertising has played a major role in fostering a consumerist society, marketing goods through various platforms in nearly all aspects of human life, and pushing the message that the potential customer's personal life requires some product.

Mass production

The Industrial Revolution dramatically increased the availability of consumer goods, although it was still primarily focused on the capital goods sector and industrial infrastructure (i.e., mining, steel, oil, transportation networks, communications networks, industrial cities, financial centers, etc.). The advent of the department store represented a paradigm shift in the experience of shopping. Customers could now buy an astonishing variety of goods, all in one place, and shopping became a popular leisure activity. While previously the norm had been the scarcity of resources, the industrial era created an unprecedented economic situation. For the first time in history, products were available in outstanding quantities, at outstandingly low prices, being thus available to virtually everyone in the industrialized West.

By the turn of the 20th century, the average worker in Western Europe or the United States still spent approximately 80–90% of their income on food and other necessities. What was needed to propel consumerism, was a system of mass production and consumption, exemplified by Henry Ford, an American car manufacturer. After observing the assembly lines in the meat-packing industry, Frederick Winslow Taylor brought his theory of scientific management to the organization of the assembly line in other industries; this unleashed incredible productivity and reduced the costs of commodities produced on assembly lines around the world.

Consumerism has long had intentional underpinnings, rather than just developing out of capitalism. As an example, Earnest Elmo Calkins noted to fellow advertising executives in 1932 that "consumer engineering must see to it that we use up the kind of goods we now merely use", while the domestic theorist Christine Frederick observed in 1929 that "the way to break the vicious deadlock of a low standard of living is to spend freely, and even waste creatively".

The older term and concept of "conspicuous consumption" originated at the turn of the 20th century in the writings of sociologist and economist, Thorstein Veblen. The term describes an apparently irrational and confounding form of economic behaviour. Veblen's scathing proposal that this unnecessary consumption is a form of status display is made in darkly humorous observations like the following:

The term "conspicuous consumption" spread to describe consumerism in the United States in the 1960s, but was soon linked to debates about media theory, culture jamming, and its corollary productivism.

Television and American consumerism 
The advent of the television in the 1950s proved to be an attractive opportunity for advertisers, who could reach potential consumers in the home using lifelike images and sound. The introduction of mass commercial television positively impacted retail sales. The television motivated consumers to purchase more products and upgrade whatever they currently had. In the United States, a new consumer culture developed centered around buying products, especially automobiles and other durable goods, to increase their social status. Woojin Kim of the University of California, Berkeley, argues that sitcoms of this era also helped to promote the suburbia.

According to Woojin, the attraction of television advertising has brought an improvement in Americans' social status. Watching television programs has become an important part of people's cultural life. Television advertising can enrich and change the content of advertising from hearing and vision and make people in contact with it. The image of television advertising is realistic, and it is easy to have an interest and desire to buy advertising goods, At the same time, the audience intentionally or unintentionally compares and comments on the advertising goods while appreciating the TV advertisements, arouses the interest of the audience by attracting attention, and forms a buying idea, which is conducive to enhancing the buying confidence. Therefore, TV can be used as a media way to accelerate and affect people's desire to buy products.

In the 21st century

Madeline Levine criticized what she saw as a large change in American culture – "a shift away from values of community, spirituality, and integrity, and toward competition, materialism and disconnection."

Businesses have realized that wealthy consumers are the most attractive targets of marketing. The upper class's tastes, lifestyles, and preferences trickle down to become the standard for all consumers. The not-so-wealthy consumers can "purchase something new that will speak of their place in the tradition of affluence". A consumer can have the instant gratification of purchasing an expensive item to improve social status.

Emulation is also a core component of 21st century consumerism. As a general trend, regular consumers seek to emulate those who are above them in the social hierarchy. The poor strive to imitate the wealthy and the wealthy imitate celebrities and other icons. The celebrity endorsement of products can be seen as evidence of the desire of modern consumers to purchase products partly or solely to emulate people of higher social status. This purchasing behavior may co-exist in the mind of a consumer with an image of oneself as being an individualist.

Cultural capital, the intangible social value of goods, is not solely generated by cultural pollution. Subcultures also manipulate the value and prevalence of certain commodities through the process of bricolage. Bricolage is the process by which mainstream products are adopted and transformed by subcultures. These items develop a function and meaning that differs from their corporate producer's intent. In many cases, commodities that have undergone bricolage often develop political meanings. For example, Doc Martens, originally marketed as workers boots, gained popularity with the punk movement and AIDs activism groups and became symbols of an individual's place in that social group. When corporate America recognized the growing popularity of Doc Martens they underwent another change in cultural meaning through counter-bricolage. The widespread sale and marketing of Doc Martens brought the boots back into the mainstream. While corporate America reaped the ever-growing profits of the increasingly expensive boot and those modeled after its style, Doc Martens lost their original political association. Mainstream consumers used Doc Martens and similar items to create an "individualized" sense identity by appropriating statement items from subcultures they admired.

When consumerism is considered as a movement to improve rights and powers of buyers in relation to sellers, there are certain traditional rights and powers of sellers and buyers.

American Dream has long been associated with consumerism. According to Sierra Club's Dave Tilford, "With less than 5 percent of world population, the U.S. uses one-third of the world's paper, a quarter of the world's oil, 23 percent of the coal, 27 percent of the aluminum, and 19 percent of the copper."

China is the world's fastest-growing consumer market. According to biologist Paul R. Ehrlich, "If everyone consumed resources at the US level, you will need another four or five Earths."

With the development of the economy, consumers' awareness of protecting their rights and interests is growing, and consumer demand is growing. Online commerce has expanded the consumer market and enhanced consumer information and market transparency. Digital fields not only bring advantages and convenience but also cause many problems and increase the opportunities for consumers to suffer damage. Under the virtual network environment, on the one hand, consumers' privacy protection is vulnerable to infringement, driven by the development of hacker technology and the Internet, on the other hand, consumers' right to know is the basic right of consumers. When purchasing goods and receiving services, we need the real situation of institutional services. Finally, in the Internet era, consumers' demand is increasing, and we also need to protect consumers' rights and interests to improve consumers' rights and interests and promote the operation of the economic market.

Socially mediated political consumerism 
Today's society has entered the era of entertainment and the Internet. Most people spend more time browsing on mobile phones than face-to-face. The convenience of social media has a subtle impact on the public and unconsciously changes people's consumption habits. The socialized Internet is gradually developing, such as Twitter, websites, news and social media, with sharing and participation as the core, consumers share product information and opinions through social media. At the same time, by understanding the reputation of the brand on social media, consumers are easy change their original attitude towards the brand. The information provided by social media helps consumers shorten the time of thinking about products and decision-making, so as to improve consumers' initiative in purchase decision-making and improve consumers' shopping and decision-making quality to a certain extent.

Criticism

In many critical contexts, consumerism is used to describe the tendency of people to identify strongly with products or services they consume, especially those with commercial brand-names and perceived status-symbolism appeal, e.g. a luxury car, designer clothing, or expensive jewelry. A main criticism of consumerism is that it exists to progress capitalism. Consumerism can take extreme forms – such that consumers sacrifice significant time and income not only to purchase but also to actively support a certain firm or brand. As stated by Gary Cross in his book "All Consuming Century: Why Consumerism Won in Modern America", he states "consumerism succeeded where other ideologies failed because it concretely expressed the cardinal political ideals of the century – liberty and democracy – and with relatively little self-destructive behavior or personal humiliation." He discusses how consumerism won in its forms of expression. However, many people are skeptical of this over-romanticised outlook.

Opponents of consumerism argue that many luxuries and unnecessary consumer-products may act as a social mechanism allowing people to identify like-minded individuals through the display of similar products, again utilizing aspects of status-symbolism to judge socioeconomic status and social stratification. Some people believe relationships with a product or brand name are substitutes for healthy human relationships lacking in societies, and along with consumerism, create a cultural hegemony, and are part of a general process of social control in modern society.

In 1955, economist Victor Lebow stated:

Figures who arguably do not wholly buy into consumerism include Pope Emeritus Benedict XVI, German historian Oswald Spengler (1880–1936), who said: "Life in America is exclusively economic in structure and lacks depth"), and French writer Georges Duhamel (1884–1966), who held American materialism up as "a beacon of mediocrity that threatened to eclipse French civilization". Francis Fukuyama blames consumerism for moral compromises.

Furthermore, some theorists have concerns with the place commodity takes in the definition of one's self. Media theorists Straut Ewen coined the term "commodity self" to describe an identity built by the goods we consume. For example, people often identify as PC or Mac users, or define themselves as a Coke drinker rather than Pepsi. The ability to choose one product out of an apparent mass of others allows a person to build a sense "unique" individuality, despite the prevalence of Mac users or the nearly identical tastes of Coke and Pepsi. By owning a product from a certain brand, one's ownership becomes a vehicle of presenting an identity that is associated with the attitude of the brand. The idea of individual choice is exploited by corporations that claim to sell "uniqueness" and the building blocks of an identity. The invention of the commodity self is a driving force of consumerist societies, preying upon the deep human need to build a sense of self.

Environmental impact
Critics of consumerism point out that consumerist societies are more prone to damage the environment, contribute to global warming and use resources at a higher rate than other societies. Dr. Jorge Majfud says that "Trying to reduce environmental pollution without reducing consumerism is like combatting drug trafficking without reducing the drug addiction."

Pope Francis also critiques consumerism in his encyclical Laudato Si': On Care For Our Common Home. He critiques the harm consumerism does to the environment and states, "The analysis of environmental problems cannot be separated from the analysis of human, family, work-related and urban contexts, nor from how individuals relate to themselves, which leads in turn to how they relate to others and to the environment." Pope Francis believes obsession with consumerism leads individuals further away from their humanity and obscures the interrelated nature between humans and the environment.

Another critic is James Gustave Speth. He argues that the growth imperative represents the main goal of capitalistic consumerism. In his book The Bridge at the Edge of the World he notes, "Basically, the economic system does not work when it comes to protecting environmental resources, and the political system does not work when it comes to correcting the economic system".

In an opinion segment of New Scientist magazine published in August 2009, reporter Andy Coghlan cited William Rees of the University of British Columbia and epidemiologist Warren Hern of the University of Colorado at Boulder saying that human beings, despite considering themselves civilized thinkers, are "subconsciously still driven by an impulse for survival, domination and expansion ... an impulse which now finds expression in the idea that inexorable economic growth is the answer to everything, and, given time, will redress all the world's existing inequalities." According to figures presented by Rees at the annual meeting of the Ecological Society of America, human society is in a "global overshoot", consuming 30% more material than is sustainable from the world's resources. Rees went on to state that at present, 85 countries are exceeding their domestic "bio-capacities", and compensate for their lack of local material by depleting the stocks of other countries, which have a material surplus due to their lower consumption. Not only that, but McCraken indicates that the ways in which consumer goods and services are bought, created and used should be taken under consideration when studying consumption.

Not all anti-consumerists oppose consumption in itself, but they argue against increasing the consumption of resources beyond what is environmentally sustainable. Jonathan Porritt writes that consumers are often unaware of the negative environmental impacts of producing many modern goods and services, and that the extensive advertising-industry only serves to reinforce increasing consumption.
Likewise, other ecological economists such as Herman Daly and Tim Jackson recognize the inherent conflict between consumer-driven consumption and planet-wide ecological degradation.

Consumerism as cultural ideology
In the 21st century's globalized economy, consumerism has become a noticeable part of the culture. Critics of the phenomenon not only criticized it against what is environmentally sustainable, but also the spread of consumerism in cultural aspects. However, several scholars have written about the intersection of consumer culture and the environment. 

Discussions of the environmental implications of consumerist ideologies in works by economists James Gustave Speth and Naomi Klein, and consumer cultural historian Gary Cross. Leslie Sklair proposes the criticism through the idea of culture-ideology of consumerism in his works. He says that,

Today, people are universally and continuously being exposed to mass consumerism and product placement in the media or even in their daily lives. The line between information, entertainment, and promotion of products has been blurred, thus explaining how people have become more reformulated into consumerist behaviours. Shopping centers are a representative example of a place where people are explicitly exposed to an environment that welcomes and encourages consumption.  For example, in 1993, Goss wrote that the shopping center designers "strive to present an alternative rationale for the shopping center's existence, manipulate shoppers' behavior through the configuration of space, and consciously design a symbolic landscape that provokes associative moods and dispositions in the shopper". On the prevalence of consumerism in daily life, Historian Gary Cross says that "The endless variation of clothing, travel, and entertainment provided opportunity for practically everyone to find a personal niche, no matter their race, age, gender or class."

Arguably, the success of the consumerist cultural ideology can be witnessed all around the world. People who rush to the mall to buy products and end up spending money with their credit cards can easily become entrenched in the financial system of capitalist globalization.

Alternatives

Since consumerism began, various individuals and groups have consciously sought an alternative lifestyle. These movements range on a spectrum from moderate "simple living", "eco-conscious shopping", and "localvore"/"buying local", to Freeganism on the extreme end. Building on these movements, the discipline of ecological economics addresses the macro-economic, social and ecological implications of a primarily consumer-driven economy.

See also 

"Keeping up with the Joneses"
American Psycho
Anthropological theories of value
Bourgeois personality
Commercialism
Commodity fetishism
Consumer Bill of Rights
Consumer capitalism
Consumer ethnocentrism
Consumer movement
Consumtariat
Corporatocracy
Cost the limit of price
Dawn of the Dead
Economic materialism
Fight Club
Geoffrey Miller (psychologist)
Greed
Homo consumericus
Horace Kallen (philosopher)
Hyperconsumerism
Hypermobility (travel)
Idiocracy
Keynesianism
Moonlight clan
One-Dimensional Man
Overconsumption
Participatory culture
Philosophy of futility
Planetary boundaries
Planned obsolescence
Post-materialism (economics)
Productivism
Prosumer
Sharing economy 
Steady state economy
The Century of the Self
The Joneses
The Paradox of Choice: Why More Is Less
They Live

References

Consumerism—An Interpretation
Consumerism, 4th Ed.
Consumerism: As a Way of Life

External links

"Consumer Culture", by Ginny Wilmerding.
 "Consumers may not realize the full impact of their choices" 
 "Globalizing consumption" by Paul James and Andy Scerri
  "Obedience, Consumerism, and Climate Change", by Yosef Brody
 A Global Consumer Solidarity Movement
AdBusters, an anti-consumerism magazine
 Center for the Advancement of the Steady State Economy, a post-consumerist macro-economic framework
 Circles of Sustainability, website for the Circles of Sustainability approach
  Consumerium Development Wiki, a wiki related to consumer activism
 Global-local consumption, by Imre Szeman and Paul James
 Peter Medlin, WNIJ, "Illinois Is the First State to Have High Schools Teach News Literacy," National Public Radio, August 12, 2021
 Postconsumers, moving beyond addictive consumerism
 Renegade Consumer, an actively anti-consumerism organization
The Human Being Lost in Consumerism: A Polish Perspective and Challenges in Religious Education, by Elżbieta Osewska and Józef Stala

 
Economic ideologies
Economic sociology